This is a summary of the different copyright policies of academic publishers for books, book chapters, and journal articles.

Publishing models 
Academic publishers fall broadly into two categories: subscription and open access, which take different approaches to copyright.

Subscription publishers typically require transfer of copyright ownership from the authors to the publisher, with the publisher monetising articles behind paywalls. The final version of an article as copyedited and typeset by the publisher is typically called the version of record. Such publishers sometimes allow certain rights to their authors, including permission to reuse parts of the paper in the author's future work, to distribute a limited number of copies. In the print format, such copies are called reprints; in the electronic format, they are called postprints.

Open access publishers allow authors to retain their copyright, but attach a reuse license to the work so that it can be hosted by the publisher and openly shared, reused and adapted. Such publishers are either funded by charging authors article processing fees (gold OA) or by being subsidised by a larger organisation (diamond OA).

Academic books and book chapters 
Academic book publishing policies are not consolidated into a single database (in contrast to the SHERPA/RoMEO database of journal policies). However, a relatively small number of academic book publishers dominate the market. Most publishers permit self-archiving of the postprint version of the author's own chapter (if contributed to only one chapter) or 10% of the total book (if contributed to multiple chapters). The notable exception is Elsevier, which is the largest publisher to not permit chapter archiving under any circumstances.

Academic journals 
Academic journal publishing policies focus on two main aspects: Whether a preprint article already openly shared can be submitted to a journal, and what version of the article can be subsequently openly shared after peer review has been concluded.

Preprints 

Academic publishers will not publish work that has already been published elsewhere, so a key issue has been the interpretation of a preprint server. Traditionally, academic have circulated pre-submission copies of their articles for informal feedback. However, open preprint servers since the 1990s increased the scale and visibility of this process and raised the question as to whether this constituted 'prior publication' or merely 'sharing'.

The majority of academic journal publishers now accept submission of articles that have already been shared as preprints, with copyright of this version remaining with the author by default.

Postprints 
The sharing of postprints (the last version of an article after peer review but before copyright is transferred to a publisher) has become increasingly permitted by academic journal publishers, typically after an embargo of 6-18 months. Journal policies are consolidated in the SHERPA/RoMEO database.

Published articles 
The copyright of the final published version of record may reside with the authors or the publisher depending on the publisher's business model. For journals following a subscription model, where articles are accessed via a paywall, copyright is transferred from author to publisher. Sharing of the final formatted article is therefore typically never permitted.

The rise of 'gold' open access academic journals stands in contrast to this, where copyright is retained by the author and a reuse license (typically a creative commons variant) applied.

See also 
 List of academic journals
 List of open-access journals
 Springer Nature
 Elsevier
 Wiley-Blackwell
 Taylor & Francis
 SAGE Publications

External links 
 SHERPA/RoMEO - Journal publisher copyright & self-archiving policies database
Transpose - Journal publisher preprinting policies database

References 

Copyright law
Academic publishing